The Society of Young Publishers (SYP) was founded in 1949. Its main aim is to enable publishers in the first ten years of their career to network, exchange ideas and learn more about the industry. Previously restricted to people under 36, the constitution was amended in 2007 to allow anybody ‘young to publishing’ or an allied industry to join. 

Headed up by an independent UK committee in charge of administration, the  SYP is also composed of six regional committees that run events in London, Oxford, Scotland, Ireland, Northern England and South West England. The current UK chairs are April Peake (Commissioning Editor at Penguin Random House) and Amalia Mihailescu (Student Advisor at University College London). 

The SYP has been running a number of digital events since March 2020 and it is looking to open up further branches in the UK, as well as examining whether its model could be adopted in other countries. The SYP publishes the magazine InPrint four times a year, in addition to holding monthly speaker events and other social events. The SYP also hosts a biannual conference, which takes place in Scotland in the spring and alternates between London and Oxford in the autumn.

References
 SYP homepage
 'The British Society of Young Publishers', an article by Jason Mitchell in the Publishing Journal Logos
 A report in The Bookseller regarding the SYP's 60th anniversary

Trade associations based in the United Kingdom